Edward John Bonin (December 23, 1904 – December 20, 1990) was a Republican member of the U.S. House of Representatives from Pennsylvania.

Life and career
Bonin was born in Hazleton, Pennsylvania, of Polish descent.  He served in the United States Navy from 1922 to 1926.  He graduated from Wyoming Seminary in Kingston, Pennsylvania in 1929, from Dickinson College in Carlisle, Pennsylvania, in 1933, and Temple University Law School in Philadelphia, Pennsylvania, in 1937.  During the Second World War he served in the United States Army.  From 1949 to 1952 he was assistant district attorney of Luzerne County, Pennsylvania, and Mayor of Hazleton, from 1951 to 1953.

Bonin was elected in 1952 as a Republican to the 83rd United States Congress, defeating incumbent Democratic Congressman Daniel J. Flood but he was an unsuccessful candidate for reelection in 1954 in a re-match against Flood.  After his term in congress, he served as assistant to the Philadelphia Regional Director of the Post Office Department from February 1955 to March 1963, and General Attorney for the Post Office Department in Washington, D.C. from March 1963 to December 1966.

See also

References

External links

The Political Graveyard

1904 births
1990 deaths
United States Army personnel of World War II
Temple University alumni
United States Army soldiers
Politicians from Hazleton, Pennsylvania
American politicians of Polish descent
Republican Party members of the United States House of Representatives from Pennsylvania
20th-century American politicians
Mayors of places in Pennsylvania